The Honduras national baseball team is the national baseball team of Honduras and is controlled by the Federación Hondureña de Béisbol. It represents the nation in senior-level men's international competition.  The team is a member of the COPABE.
Baseball is popular in Honduras, though Soccer or Football is Honduras' national sport

References

Baseball
National baseball teams